Do, DO or D.O. may refer to:

Languages
 The English verb, do, which may serve as an auxiliary verb; see do-support
 Do (kana), a mora symbol in Japanese writing
 Ditto mark

People
 Đỗ, a Vietnamese surname
 Do (surname), includes people with the surname
 D.O. (entertainer) (born 1993), South Korean singer and actor
 D.O. (rapper), Canadian rapper
 Do (singer) (born 1981), Dutch singer
 Marshall Applewhite (1931–1997), American cult leader

Music
 The Dø, a French/Finnish indie pop band
 Do (Do album), an album by Dutch singer Do
 Do (Psychostick album)
 C (musical note), the first note of the musical scale in fixed do solfège
 Delta Omicron, an international music fraternity
 Do, the first syllable of the scale in solfège
 Do, a type of buk (drum) used in Korean ritual music
 "Do", a song by the White Stripes from the 1999 album The White Stripes (album)

Science and medicine 
 The DO, an online magazine published by the American Osteopathic Association
 Dansgaard–Oeschger event, in climate science
 Delta Omega, an American public health honorary society
 Doctor of Osteopathic Medicine
 Dissolved oxygen

Technology
 .do, the country code top level domain for the Dominican Republic
 Dornier Flugzeugwerke, a defunct German aircraft manufacturer
 GNOME Do, an application launcher for Linux
 Dō, the torso protection in a suit of kendo armor

Places 
 Do (province), the Korean and Japanese administrative division equivalent to the ancient Chinese dao
 Do (administrative division), an administrative unit in both North and South Korea
 Do (Berkovići), Bosnia and Herzegovina
 Do (Hadžići), Bosnia and Herzegovina
 Do, Stolac, Bosnia and Herzegovina
 Do (Trebinje), Bosnia and Herzegovina
 Do, Ivory Coast
 Dominican Republic

Other uses
 DO (film)
 Dō (philosophy), a doctrine or lifestyle in Japanese and Korean cultures
 Delivery order
 Denominación de origen, a Spanish wine appellation
 Directorate of Operations (CIA) of the United States Central Intelligence Agency
 Dominicana de Aviación, a defunct Dominican airline
 Do, the number twelve in the duodecimal system

See also 
 D0 (disambiguation) (D followed by zero)
 Doe (disambiguation)
 Doo (disambiguation)
 Doh (disambiguation)